The Missa solemnis in D major, Op. 123, is a Solemn Mass composed by Ludwig van Beethoven from 1819 to 1823. It was first performed on 7 April 1824 in Saint Petersburg, Russia, under the auspices of Beethoven's patron Prince Nikolai Galitzin; an incomplete performance was given in Vienna on 7 May 1824, when the Kyrie, Credo, and Agnus Dei were conducted by the composer. It is generally considered one of the composer's supreme achievements and, along with Bach's Mass in B minor, one of the most significant Mass settings of the common practice period.

Written around the same time as his Ninth Symphony, it is Beethoven's second setting of the Mass, after his Mass in C major, Op. 86. The work was dedicated to Archduke Rudolf of Austria, archbishop of Olmütz, Beethoven's foremost patron as well as pupil and friend. The copy presented to Rudolf was inscribed "Von Herzen—Möge es wieder—Zu Herzen gehn!" ("From the heart – may it return to the heart!")

Structure 
Like many masses, Beethoven's Missa solemnis is in five movements:

{| class="wikitable"
! style="background: Silver" |Tempo marking
! style="background: Silver" |Meter
! style="background: Silver" |Key
|-
! colspan="3" align="center" |Kyrie
|-
|Assai sostenuto. Mit Andacht
| align="center" | 
| align="center" | D
|-
|Andante assai bem marcato.
| align="center" | 
| align="center" | D
|-
|Tempo I
| align="center" | 
| align="center" | D
|-
! colspan="3" align="center" |Gloria 
|-
|Allegro vivace
| align="center" | 
| align="center" | D
|-
|Meno Allegro
| align="center" | 
| align="center" | B
|-
|Tempo I
| align="center" | 
| align="center" | B, F
|-
| Largetto
| align="center" | 
| align="center" | Dm, D, B, D
|-
|Allegro maestoso
| align="center" | 
| align="center" | D
|-
|Allegro, ma non troppo e ben marcato
| align="center" | 
| align="center" | D
|-
|Poco piu Allegro
| align="center" | 
| align="center" | D
|-
|Presto
| align="center" | 
| align="center" | D
|-
! colspan="3" align="center" |Credo
|-
|Allegro na non troppo
| align="center" | 
| align="center" | B
|-
|Adagio
| align="center" | 
| align="center" | Dm
|-
| Andante
| align="center" | 
| align="center" | D
|-
| Adagio expressivo
| align="center" | 
| align="center" | Dm
|-
|Allegro
| align="center" | 
| align="center" | C
|-
|Allegro molto
| align="center" | 
| align="center" | F
|-
|Allegro ma non tropo
| align="center" | 
| align="center" | F
|-
|Allegro ma non tropo; Allegro con motto
| align="center" | 
| align="center" | B
|-
|Grave
| align="center" | 
| align="center" | B
|-
! colspan="3" align="center" |Sanctus
|-
|Adagio. Mit Andacht
| align="center" | 
| align="center" | D
|-
|Allegro pesante
| align="center" | 
| align="center" | D
|-
|Presto
| align="center" | 
| align="center" | D
|-
|Praeludium – Sostenuto ma non troppo
| align="center" | 
| align="center" | G
|-
|Andante molto cantabile e non troppo mosso
| align="center" | 
| align="center" | G, C, G
|-
! colspan="3" align="center" |Agnus Dei
|-
|Adagio
| align="center" | 
| align="center" | D
|-
|Alegretto vivace (Bitte um innern und äussern Frieden)
| align="center" | 
| align="center" | D
|-
|Allegro assai
| align="center" | 
| align="center" | B
|-
|Tempo I
| align="center" | 
| align="center" | F, D
|-
|Presto
| align="center" | 
| align="center" | D, B
|-
|Tempo I
| align="center" | 
| align="center" | B, D
|-
|}

Analysis:

 Kyrie eleison: Perhaps the most traditional movement, the Kyrie is in a traditional ABA′ structure. The grand opening 3 D major chords motif, contrasts sharply with the 4th pianissimo response: (GOD/man) followed by humble stately choral writing in the first section and more contrapuntal vocal textures in the Christe section. The four (SATB) vocal soloists and chorus share the thematic material throughout, the former particularly in the Christe Eleison section.
 Gloria: Quickly shifting textures and themes highlight each portion of the Gloria text, in a beginning to the movement that is almost encyclopedic in its exploration of  time. The movement ends with the first of the work's two fugues, on the text "In gloria Dei patris. Amen", leading into a recapitulation of the initial Gloria text and music.
 Credo: The movement opens with a chord sequence that will be used again in the movement to effect modulations. The word "Credo" is repeatedly sung in a two-note motif, and the work thus joins the tradition of so-called "Credo Masses", including Wolfgang Amadeus Mozart's Missa brevis in F major, K. 192 and Mass in C major, K. 257. The Credo, like the Gloria, is an often disorienting, mad rush through the text. The poignant modal harmonies for the "Et incarnatus" yield to ever more expressive heights through the Crucifixus, and into a remarkable, a cappella setting of the "Et resurrexit" that is over almost before it has begun. Most notable about the movement, though, is the closing fugue on "Et vitam venturi saeculi" that includes one of the most difficult passages in the choral repertoire, when the subject returns at doubled tempo for a thrilling conclusion.

The form of the Credo is divided into four parts: (I) allegro ma non troppo through "descendit de coelis" in B; (II) "Et incarnatus est" through "Resurrexit" in D; (III) "Et ascendit" through the Credo recapitulation in F; (IV) fugue and coda "Et vitam venturi saeculi, amen" in B.

 Sanctus: Up until the Benedictus of the Sanctus, the Missa solemnis is of fairly normal classical proportions. But then, after an orchestral preludio, a solo violin enters in its highest range—representing the Holy Spirit descending to earth in a remarkably long extension of the text.
 Agnus Dei: A setting of the plea "miserere nobis" (have mercy on us) that begins with the men's voices alone in B minor yields, eventually, to a bright D major prayer "dona nobis pacem" ("grant us peace") in a pastoral mode. After some fugal development, it is suddenly and dramatically interrupted by martial sounds (a convention in the 18th century, as in Haydn's Missa in tempore belli), but after repeated pleas of "miserere", eventually recovers and brings itself to a close.

Scoring and music 
The mass is scored for a quartet of vocal soloists, a substantial chorus, and the full orchestra. Each at times is used in virtuosic, textural, and melodic capacities. The full roster consists of 2 flutes; 2 oboes, 2 clarinets (in A, C, and B); 2 bassoons; contrabassoon; 4 horns (in D, E, B basso, E, and G); 2 trumpets (D, B, and C); alto, tenor, and bass trombone; timpani; organ continuo; strings (violins I and II, violas, cellos, and basses); soprano, alto, tenor, and bass soloists; and mixed choir.

The writing displays Beethoven's characteristic disregard for the performer, and is in several places both technically and physically exacting, with many sudden changes of dynamic, metre and tempo. This is consistent throughout, starting with the opening Kyrie where the syllables Ky-ri are delivered either forte or with sforzando, but the final e is piano. As noted above, the reprise of the Et vitam venturi fugue is particularly taxing, being both subtly different from the previous statements of the theme and counter-theme, and delivered at around twice the speed. The orchestral parts also include many demanding sections, including the violin solo in the Sanctus and some of the most demanding work in the repertoire for bassoon and contrabassoon.

A typical performance of the complete work runs 80 to 85 minutes. The difficulty of the piece combined with the requirements for a full orchestra, large chorus, and highly trained soloists, both vocal and instrumental, mean that it is not often performed by amateur or semi-professional ensembles.

Reception 

Some critics have been troubled that, as Theodor W. Adorno put it, "there is something peculiar about the Missa solemnis." In many ways, it is an atypical work, and lacks the sustained thematic development that is one of Beethoven's hallmarks. The fugues at the end of the Gloria and Credo align it with the work of his late period—but his simultaneous interest in the theme and variations form is absent. Instead, the Missa presents a continuous musical narrative, almost without repetition, particularly in the Gloria and Credo, the two longest movements. The style, Adorno has noted, is close to treatment of themes in imitation that one finds in the Flemish masters such as Josquin des Prez and Johannes Ockeghem, but it is unclear whether Beethoven was consciously imitating their techniques to meet the demands of the Mass text. Donald Tovey has connected Beethoven to the earlier tradition in a different way:

Michael Spitzer presents an alternative view of the historical context of Beethoven's mass composition:

References

Further reading

External links 

 
 Kristin Diana Trayer: Ludwig van Beethoven's Missa Solemnis, Mass in D, Op.123 fulminiesaette.it
 Jan Swafford: Missa Solemnis, a Divine Bit of Beethoven, NPR

Compositions by Ludwig van Beethoven
Beethoven
1823 compositions
Compositions in D major
Music dedicated to benefactors or patrons
Music dedicated to nobility or royalty